The Washington Apartments are an apartment building in the New York City borough of Manhattan. Completed in 1884, it is notable for being the first apartment building in central Harlem. The New York City Landmarks Preservation Commission designated the building a historic landmark on July 15, 1991.

References 

New York City Designated Landmarks in Manhattan
Apartment buildings in New York City
Queen Anne architecture in New York City